Joshua Pomer (born April 8, 1980) is an American film director, screenwriter, film producer and executive producer.

Early life and education
Pomer grew up on the west side of Santa Cruz, California. He attended Santa Cruz High School and graduated in 1992. He later studied film at the University of California, Santa Barbara and earned a bachelor of arts degree in 1998.

Career
In a career that started at the age of 16, Pomer's films have covered many themes and genres.  Pomer's early documentary films were seen as surf adventure films.  In later years, his films began addressing such issues as broken homes, drug addiction and recovery. Pomer is considered one of the most popular filmmakers in the history of surfing cinema. Pomer is the director, writer and creator of "The Westsiders"—an award winning documentary about a Santa Cruz, California surf tribe. As the director and the writer of "The Westsiders"; he won Outstanding Achievement in documentary film making at the Newport Beach Film Festival 2010, Golden Lobster Award for best feature film at the Portland Maine Film Festival 2010, Honorable Mention at the 2010 LA Film Awards, Aloha Accolade Award 2010 at the Honolulu International Film Festival, Best Story 2010 at the California Surf Festival, and Best Documentary 2010 at The Santa Cruz Film Festival.

Pomer's most recent documentary film, "Discovering Mavericks" (2013) stars Darryl Virostko, Jeff Clark, Peter Mel and Tom Powers.  It is a documentary film exploring the history of Mavericks including the death of Mark Foo and Sion Milosky, as well as updating the true story of Mavericks surfer Jay Moriarity who was the subject of the film Chasing Mavericks.

References

External links
 
 Surfing Magazine Article on The Westsiders
 Huffington Post Article on Joshua Pomer
 Article on The Westsiders
 Josh Pomer Website
  Joshua Pomer on Director's Panel at Newport Beach Film Festival
 The Westsiders Website
 Review of The Westsiders
 Good Times Film Review
 Drift Film Review
 Josh Pomer Press Release
 Interview with Joshua Pomer
 Article on Joshua Pomer and The Westsiders
 Report on Josh Pomer
 Metro Santa Cruz Article on Joshua Pomer
 Santa Cruz Sentinel Article on Joshua Pomer
 ESPN
http://www.nbclosangeles.com/news/california/TIMELINE-A-Look-Back-at-the-Titans-of-Mavericks-413206993.html

American film directors
Living people
1980 births
American male screenwriters
American film producers
University of California, Santa Barbara alumni